Makedones Thessalonikis F.C., the Macedonians,  is a professional football club based in Ampelokipoi, Thessaloniki, Greece. 

The club, originally named MAKEDON, was founded in 1987 from the merger of Megas Alexandros FC. .

Football clubs in Thessaloniki
Association football clubs established in 1987
1987 establishments in Greece